Cauchi is a Maltese surname. Notable people with the surname include:

Denis Cauchi (born 1965), former Maltese professional footballer
Gaia Cauchi (born 2002), winner of the Junior Eurovision Song Contest 2013
Gino Cauchi (born 1968), Maltese politician
John Cauchi, lawyer and former Attorney General of Tonga (2009–2010)
Nikol Joseph Cauchi (1929–2010), Roman Catholic bishop of Gozo
Thomas Cauchi, 17th century Maltese philosopher who specialised in law

Cauchi is also an alternative spelling for Chauci, found in Velleius Paterculus.

See also
Cauchy (disambiguation)

Maltese-language surnames

fr:Cauchi